Rezawrecktion were a Native American Music Award-winning hip-hop group. Formed by four members of the Apsáalooke, the band self-released an album in 2005, It's Time, and were nominated for that year's Gospel/Christian Recording Native American Music Award. They won the award and immediately began touring, while working on a second album. The group then became defunct, with Supaman beginning a solo career.

References 

Crow people
Native American rappers
Christian hip hop groups